Denis Landry (born November 13, 1957) is the Mayor-elect of Hautes-Terre and a former MLA and Leader of the Opposition in the province of New Brunswick, Canada.  He was elected to the Legislative Assembly of New Brunswick in 1995 and re-elected in  2003, 2006, 2010, 2014, 2018, and 2020. He was defeated in his first bid for re-election in 1999.

Background
Landry was born in Val-Doucet, New Brunswick and was educated at the Memramcook Institute, St. Francis Xavier University and the Université de Moncton. He was a logger for 17 years before working for the Canadian Paperworkers Union as local secretary-treasurer and later local president. He has served as President of the Acadian Peninsula Labour Council and president of the coalition against changes in unemployment insurance, a coalition composed of 15 different organizations.  Landry later became a sales representative at a car dealership.

Politics

Landry was Minister of Justice in the government of Brian Gallant from 2016 until the Liberals lost power in 2018. He served in other cabinet roles since beginning of the Gallant administration in 2014.

Landry was chosen interim leader of the Liberal Party of New Brunswick on February 12, 2019, following the resignation of Brian Gallant.

Landry represented during the 57th Legislative Assembly the electoral district of Centre-Péninsule-Saint-Sauveur, though prior to the 2006 election the district was known simply as Centre-Péninsule.

Landry won re-election to the 58th Legislative Assembly in the Bathurst East-Nepisiguit-Saint-Isidore riding.

Landry was elected mayor of the new municipality of Hautes-Terres by acclamation in the 2022 New Brunswick municipal elections.

References 

1957 births
Living people
Members of the Executive Council of New Brunswick
New Brunswick Liberal Association MLAs
People from Bathurst, New Brunswick
People from Gloucester County, New Brunswick
21st-century Canadian politicians
New Brunswick Liberal Association leaders
Mayors of places in New Brunswick